Khanskaya  is a Russian Air Force air base located on the north-west of Maykop, Russia. The airport was used also for civil aviation up to 2009.

The base is home to the 761st Training Aviation Regiment which flies the Aero L-39C Albatros under the 783rd Aviation Training Centre for the Training of Flight Personnel.

The regiment moved here during 1991.

References

Russian Air Force bases
Airports built in the Soviet Union
Airports in Adygea